A bor ("The Wine") is a Hungarian play, written by Géza Gárdonyi. It was first produced in 1901. It established the Hungarian peasant drama as a more realistic form. 

The play has been translated into Finnish, Italian, Polish and Romanian.

There is a 1933 Hungarian film version.

References

External links 
 

Hungarian plays
1901 plays
Works about wine
1933 films
Hungarian drama films